United Nations Security Council Resolution 221, adopted on April 9, 1966, after recalling previous resolutions on the topic (including the provision for an oil embargo), the Council was gravely concerned that Southern Rhodesia might receive a large supply of oil as the Joanna V, an oil tanker, had already arrived at Beira.

The Council called upon Portugal to not let oil be pumped through the Companhia do Pipeline Moçambique Rodésias Pipeline into Southern Rhodesia.  It called upon all states to ensure the diversion of vessels reasonably believed to be carrying oil destined for Southern Rhodesia.  The resolution also called upon the government of the United Kingdom to prevent, by force if necessary, the arrival at Beira of vessels reasonably believed to be carrying oil destined for Southern Rhodesia.

Resolution 221 was adopted by ten votes to none; the People's Republic of Bulgaria, France, Mali, the Soviet Union and Uruguay abstained from voting.

See also
List of United Nations Security Council Resolutions 201 to 300 (1965–1971)
The Beira Patrol

References
Text of the Resolution at undocs.org

External links
 

 0221
 0221
 0221
 0221
United Nations Security Council sanctions regimes
Portuguese Mozambique
History of Rhodesia
April 1966 events